Pachycara is a genus of marine ray-finned fishes belonging to the family Zoarcidae, the eelpouts. The fishes in this genus are found in the Atlantic, Indian, Southern and Pacific Ocean.

Species
There are currently 29 recognized species in this genus:
 Pachycara alepidotum M. E. Anderson & Mincarone, 2006
 Pachycara angeloi Thiel, Kneblsberger, Kihara & Gerdes, 2021
 Pachycara andersoni Møller, 2003 (Anderson's eelpout)
 Pachycara arabica Møller, 2003 (Arabian eelpout)
 Pachycara brachycephalum  (Pappenheim, 1912)
 Pachycara bulbiceps (Garman, 1899) (Snub-nose eelpout)
 Pachycara caribbaeum M. E. Anderson, R. N. Somerville & Copley, 2016 
 Pachycara cousinsi Møller & N. J. King 2007 (Brown eelpout)
 Pachycara crassiceps (Roule, 1916)
 Pachycara crossacanthum M. E. Anderson, 1989
 Pachycara dolichaulus M. E. Anderson, 2006
 Pachycara garricki M. E. Anderson, 1990
 Pachycara goni M. E. Anderson, 1991
 Pachycara gymninium M. E. Anderson & Peden, 1988 (Naked-nape eelpout)
 Pachycara karenae M. E. Anderson, 2012
 Pachycara lepinium M. E. Anderson & Peden, 1988 (Scaly-nape eelpout)
 Pachycara matallanasi Corbella & Møller, 2014 
 Pachycara mesoporum M. E. Anderson, 1989
 Pachycara microcephalum (A. S. Jensen, 1902)
 Pachycara moelleri Shinohara, 2012 
 Pachycara nazca M. E. Anderson & Bluhm, 1997
 Pachycara pammelas M. E. Anderson, 1989
 Pachycara priedei Møller & N. J. King, 2007
 Pachycara rimae M. E. Anderson, 1989
 Pachycara saldanhai Biscoito & A. J. T. Almeida, 2004
 Pachycara shcherbachevi M. E. Anderson, 1989
 Pachycara sulaki M. E. Anderson, 1989
 Pachycara suspectum (Garman, 1899)
 Pachycara thermophilum Geistdoerfer, 1994

References

Lycodinae
 
Marine fish genera
Taxa named by Erich Zugmayer